The Second Periodic Review of Westminster constituencies was undertaken between 1965 and 1969 by the four Boundary Commissions for England, Scotland, Wales and Northern Ireland for the United Kingdom Parliament as provided by the House of Commons (Redistribution of Seats) Act 1949 and amended by House of Commons (Redistribution of Seats) Act 1958. The changes to the constituencies were approved in 1970 and took effect at the February 1974 United Kingdom general election.

Review and approval process 
Under the House of Commons (Redistribution of Seats) Act 1958, the four Boundary Commissions were required to review the boundaries of parliamentary constituencies in their respective countries every 10 to 15 years. The Commissions commenced their reports in 1965 and completed them in 1969. Although the final recommendations were laid before Parliament (1968-69 Cmnd. 4084-4087), the Labour Government did not put them forward for approval before calling an election which was held in June 1970. After the election, the new Conservative Government put the proposals forward and they were approved by Parliament on 11 November 1970 through the following Statutory Instruments:

 1970 No. 1674 - Parliamentary Constituencies (England) Order 1970
 1970 No. 1675 - Parliamentary Constituencies (Wales) Order 1970
 1970 No. 1678 - Parliamentary Constituencies (Northern Ireland) Order 1970 
 1970 No. 1680 - Parliamentary Constituencies (Scotland) Order 1970

The new boundaries were first applied for the February 1974 general election. Accordingly, there was a gap of nine years between the beginning of the process and their first application, by which time the local authority boundaries used in the review had been superseded by the major reorganisation of local authorities brought in by the Local Government Act 1972 which came into effect on 1 April 1974. The boundaries and constituencies introduced by the Second Review were also used for the general elections of October 1974 and 1979.  They were superseded by the boundaries introduced by the Third Review which came into effect for the 1983 general election.

Summary of changes 
As a result of the considerable delay between the First and Second Periodic Reviews, there were a large number of significant changes, with the total number of seats increasing from 630 to 635. There were 108 new constituencies created and 103 abolished, excluding 13 constituencies with very minor or no changes which were renamed. The resulting net increase of 5 constituencies were all in England (511 to 516), with the number of constituencies in Wales (36), Scotland (71) and Northern Ireland (12) remaining the same. There were changes to a further 311 constituencies, of which 105 were of a very minor nature, mainly bringing constituency boundaries in line with local authority boundaries which had been altered. This left 216 constituencies which were unchanged.

The Review took into account the creation of Greater London with effect from 1 April 1965, as provided by the London Government Act 1963. There was a net decrease of 11 seats within Greater London and this was offset by increases in seats in the surrounding counties of Essex, Hertfordshire, Buckinghamshire, Berkshire, Surrey and Kent. There had also been significant reorganisations of local authorities in the Black Country and Teesside resulting in major changes to boundaries in these areas. Outside the large cities, the bulk the constituencies in Lancashire and the West Riding of Yorkshire were unchanged.

The Commissions had carried out interim reviews in 1956, 1960 and 1964 under the provisions of the House of Commons (Redistribution of Seats) Act 1949 to bring boundaries into line with those of local authorities. This resulted in the passing of 31 Statutory Instruments, affecting 79 constituencies.

List of constituencies created, abolished or altered 
Primary source: Craig, F. W. S. (1972). Boundaries of Parliamentary Constituencies 1885-1972. Chichester: Political Reference Publications. . Pages 119 to 158.

Also referred to Boundary Maps on the Vision of Britain Through Time website.

BC denotes a Borough Constituency; CC denotes a County Constituency.

England

Wales

Scotland

Northern Ireland

References 

Periodic Reviews of Westminster constituencies